Boju may refer to:
Boju, a village in Cojocna Commune, Cluj County, Romania
Bójú (亳菊), variety of chrysanthemum tea originating in Bozhou district, Anhui, China
Boju (柏舉), locality in present-day Macheng, Hubei Province, China where the Battle of Boju was fought
Boju, grandma in nepali

People with the given name Boju include:
Zhao Boju (1120–1182), Chinese painter of the early Southern Song Dynasty